was a Japanese ultra-nationalist politician, Imperial Japanese apologist, and brief political hopeful. She was the granddaughter of General Hideki Tōjō, the Japanese wartime prime minister who was convicted as a Class A war criminal and hanged after World War II in 1948.

Politics 
In May 2007, Tojo revealed her intention to run in the House of Councillors election at the age of 68. She ran on a far-right platform. Tojo denied Japanese war crimes during World War II.

Tojo was a patron of The Truth about Nanjing, a movie made with the intention to expose what the filmmaker Satoru Mizushima saw as propagandistic aspects of the Nanjing Massacre. Mizushima alleges that the 1937 Nanking Massacre was a politically motivated fabrication by China and numerous western eyewitnesses.

Japan's nationalists including the late former Prime Minister Shinzō Abe, have distanced themselves from her. Political commentator Minoru Morita has said of her, “Tojo’s nationalistic attitude might appeal to certain elements of the population, but most Japanese do not sympathize with her views. She has no chance at all at the elections,"

Death 

Tojo died on February 13, 2013, from interstitial pneumonia at the age of 73, ten years after her entry into politics.

Quotes 
"Japan did not fight a war of aggression. It fought in self-defense. Our children have been wrongly taught that their ancestors did evil things, that their country is evil. We need to give these children back their pride and confidence".

"In Japan, there are no war criminals. Every one of those enshrined at Yasukuni died fighting for their country, and we should honor them".

"Many people, including Kyuma, believe that the atomic bombs stopped Japan's 'aggression,' but Japan did not fight a war of aggression". "If there was one mistake, however, it was the fact that we lost. And if my grandfather is to blame, it's not because he started the war but because we lost".

"People think I'm a hawk, but I'm actually a dove on the torii of Yasukuni Shrine".

References

External links 

 Official Site
 News about her election intentions
 Interview by Deborah Cameron

1939 births
2013 deaths
Deaths from pneumonia in Japan
Japanese activists
Japanese women activists
Japanese nationalists
Japanese monarchists
Japanese political candidates
Nanjing Massacre deniers
Place of birth missing
Historical negationism